Peter Blokhuis  (born 7 February 1947 in Baambrugge) is a Dutch philosopher and politician. From 9 April 2005 to 12 May 2012, he was Party Chairman of the ChristianUnion. He was succeeded by Janneke Louisa.

References
Peter Blokhuis nieuwe voorzitter ChristenUnie, Nieuwsbank.nl, February 3, 2005.

External links

1947 births
Living people
Christian Union (Netherlands) politicians
21st-century Dutch politicians
20th-century Dutch philosophers
Protestant Church Christians from the Netherlands
Officers of the Order of Orange-Nassau
Chairmen of the Christian Union (Netherlands)
People from Abcoude
Vrije Universiteit Amsterdam alumni